Gavrilovka is a rural locality (a selo) in Bala-Chetyrmansky Selsoviet, Fyodorovsky District, Bashkortostan, Russia. The population was 240 as of 2010.

Geography 
Gavrilovka is located 39 km east of Fyodorovka (the district's administrative centre) by road.

References 

Rural localities in Fyodorovsky District